Nová Ves nad Popelkou is a municipality and village in Semily District in the Liberec Region of the Czech Republic. It has about 700 inhabitants.

Geography
It lies in the Giant Mountains Foothills. The Popelka stream flows through the municipality. There is one pond in the municipality called Taliňák.

History

The first written mention of Nová Ves nad Popelkou is from 1369. The exact year of the village's foundation is unknown, it was probably between 1200 and 1250. According to a unverified source, already in 1097 the Slavic settlers built the Church of Saint Procopius here. The former name of the village is Nová Ves u Lomnice na Jičínsku.

Sights
The Church of Saint Procopius went through several renovations over the years and its current form dates from 1747. The church tower is from 1749.

References

Villages in Semily District